Paxson Airport  is a privately owned public-use airport in Paxson, located in the Valdez-Cordova Census Area of the U.S. state of Alaska.

Facilities 
Paxson Airport has one runway designated 13/31 with a turf and gravel surface measuring 1,800 by 60 feet (549 x 18 m).

References

External links
 FAA Alaska airport diagram (GIF)
 Topographic map from USGS The National Map

Airports in Copper River Census Area, Alaska
Privately owned airports